Hexagonaria is a genus of colonial rugose coral. Fossils are found in rock formations dating to the Devonian period, about 350 million years ago. Specimens of Hexagonaria can be found in most of the rock formations of the Traverse Group in Michigan. Fossils of this genus form Petoskey stones, the state stone of Michigan. They can be seen and found in most Midwestern states.

Hexagonaria is a common constituent of the coral reefs exposed in Devonian Fossil Gorge below the Coralville Lake spillway and in many exposures of the Coralville Formation in the vicinity of Coralville, Iowa.

Species Identification 
Based on Erwin C. Strumm's Corals of the Traverse Group of Michigan Part 13, Hexagonaria, published in 1970.

Image Gallery

References

Further reading

Stauriida
Prehistoric Hexacorallia genera
Paleozoic life of Ontario
Paleozoic life of Alberta
Paleozoic life of British Columbia
Paleozoic life of Manitoba
Paleozoic life of the Northwest Territories
Paleozoic life of Nunavut
Paleozoic life of Yukon